Trønder-Avisa is a regional newspaper in Norway. It is printed in the town of Steinkjer in Nord-Trøndelag. The newspaper was founded as a union of Nord-Trøndelag (founded 1919) and Inntrøndelagen (founded 1897) after both newspapers' headquarters were bombed during the Second World War. These two papers were originally connected to the Norwegian Centre Party and the  Liberal Party (Inntrøndelagen). This connection still exists to some extent by ownership. The newspaper is published by a company with the same name, Trønder-Avisa Group. The company also owns the local papers Inderøyningen, Steinkjer-Avisa, Lokalavisa Verran-Namdalseid, Ytringen and Snåsningen.

See also
List of Norwegian newspapers

References

External links
 Official website

1940 establishments in Norway
Newspapers published in Norway
Mass media in Trøndelag
Norwegian-language newspapers
Newspapers established in 1940